Michael Denis Lett (December 8, 1938 – January 28, 2013) was a politician from the island of Grenada.  He represented the constituency of Saint David in the lower house of the parliament from 2003 until his death, and since 2008 served as that nation's Minister of Agriculture, Forestry and Fisheries.  He was also a Land Surveyor. He raised 6 of his children after the death of his wife, Dawne Lett (née Sylvester). He died in 2013 of prostate cancer at the age of 74.

References

2013 deaths
Government ministers of Grenada
Members of the House of Representatives of Grenada
1938 births

External links 

 Campaign bio (2003)